Laura Bispuri (born 20 August 1977) is an Italian director and screenwriter.

Biography
After graduating in Cinema at the Sapienza University of Rome, Bispuri attended the Fandango Lab Workshop, a school of cinema in Rome. After directing a documentary named Via del Pigneto in 2003, Bispuri made her first short film Passing Time in 2010, which earned her the David di Donatello for Best Short Film.

Her first feature film, Sworn Virgin, was presented at the 65th Berlin International Film Festival, and her second film, Daughter of Mine, was presented at the 68th Berlin International Film Festival.

Filmography

Feature films
 Sworn Virgin (2015)
 Daughter of Mine (2018)
 The Peacock's Paradise (2021)

Short films
 Passing Time (2010)
 Salve regina (2010)
 Biondina (2011)

References

External links
 

1977 births
Living people
Film people from Rome
Italian film directors
Italian film actresses
Italian screenwriters
Italian women screenwriters
Sapienza University of Rome alumni